Aglantha is a genus of deep-sea hydrozoans of the family Rhopalonematidae.

Species
There are four species recognized in the genus Aglantha:
 Aglantha digitale (O. F. Müller, 1776)
 Aglantha elata (Haeckel, 1879)
 Aglantha elongata (Lesson, 1843)
 Aglantha intermedia Bigelow, 1909

References

Rhopalonematidae
Hydrozoan genera
Taxa named by Ernst Haeckel